The Sentinel (sometimes The Sentinel or Sentinel Tower) is a luxury residential skyscraper in Takapuna, the central business area of North Shore City, New Zealand. The largest and currently only skyscraper in the city, it has 30 storeys. and is 150 m tall. It offers views over the Waitemata Harbour, the wider Hauraki Gulf as well as over to the Auckland CBD skyline. The Sentinel was opened to the first residents in February 2008.

The building contains 117 apartments, with the uppermost two levels forming a 675 m² penthouse, which was sold in 2007 for NZ$11 million. A communal area on level four includes a 25 m x 6 m heated swimming pool and spa, sauna and gym facilities as well as landscaped areas.

The building contains a number of motifs, from the square (used extensively in the glass facade proportions and in smaller details), to a woven flax basket (hinted at in the latticework of the facade) to the spire on top of the building which evokes a sail, especially from further away across the Hauraki Gulf.

The Sentinel was built by Multiplex Constructions for NZ$60 million and was given a non-notified consent by North Shore City Council because the idea of having a landmark building in Takapuna was considered favourably when the developer Cornerstone Group first proposed it in 2003. The developer has also stated that the consenting regulations have since become onerous to a degree that he would not build such a building under current rules.

See also 
 List of tallest buildings in Auckland

References

External links

The Sentinel (official building website)

Skyscrapers in Auckland
2000s architecture in New Zealand
Residential skyscrapers
Residential buildings completed in 2008